Simphiwe Majobe Nhlangulela, better known by her stage name Simmy, is a South African singer-songwriter.

She gained prominence in 2018, after signed  a record deal with EL World Music and release her debut album Tugela Fairy (2018), spawned with hit singles "Ngiyesaba", "Ubala", "Umahlalela". The album was certified  gold by the Recording industry of South Africa.

Her second studio album Tugela fairy (Made of Stars) (2020), which debuted number 3 in one country.

Life and career

Early life and education 
Simphiwe Majobe Nhlangulela was born in South Africa, as the youngest of four children. In an interview with Emmanuel Tjiya Sowetan newspaper, Simmy revealed that she was raised by strict parents growing up. She is an alumna of University of KwaZulu-Natal, where she studied Social Sciences.

In 2013, while she was attending  at University of KwaZulu-Natal, Nhlangulela met Sandile Sithole who introduced  her to Sun-El Musician. After she completed  her degree in Social Science, Simmy  relocated  to Johannesburg in 2016 to pursue her  musical career.

Music career 

Simmy started her career by auditioning for SA Idols and SA Has Got Talent but was unsuccessful.

2017-2019:Tugela Fairy 
Her professional music career started in 2017 by signing to El World Music after completing her studies which was followed by the release of her debut studio album Tugela Fairy, which was featured in Apple Music artist Spotlight. In February 22, her single "Ubala" was released featuring Sun-El Musician. The song was certified gold. The album was released on October 26, 2018, and was certified gold by the Recording industry of South Africa (RiSA) for South Africa 25 000 sales. Her single  "Umahlalela" was certified platinum  plaque. At the 25th South African Music Awards, Tugela Fairy was nominated for Best Afro Pop Album.

At the 2019 South African Dance Music Awards, she won Best Female Vocalist award.

2020-present:Tugela Fairy (Made of Stars) 
Simmy announced work on her second studio album prior to the release of Tugela Fairy, with progress on the record continuing throughout 2020. In March 2020, she released a single "Ngihamba Nawe" fused with the classic Afro-House/neo-soul featuring vocals from Sino Msolo.
In October 2020, Simmy headlined to Rose Fest.

On November 9, 2020, her second studio album Tugela Fairy (Made of Stars) was released, which debuted number 3 on Apple Music Charts. The album features Mthunzi, S-Tone, Da Capo, Sun-El Musician, Sino Msolo, Ami Faku, and Khuzani. Tugela Fairy (Made of Stars) received nomination for Best Afro Pop  album  at the 27th South African Music Awards.

To promote her album Simmy launched Tugela Fairy (Made of Stars) Special Virtual Concert.

She was featured on Shay’na nge White Star campaign, which includes two dates, in May 2022. The first show was held  at  Johannesburg on 12 May, and last one in Durban on 21 May.

Artistry 
Growing up in Tugela, she mainly  listened to Mbaqanga, country music and Maskandi. Simmy music is generally Afro-house and Neo-Soul but she also incorporates Maskandi and RnB to her other songs.  
She has cited a number of artists as her inspiration Dolly Parton, Soul Brothers, Letta Mbuli, and Brenda Fassie.

Personal life 
Simmy is known to keeping her personal life private.

Discography

Studio albums

 Tugela Fairy (2018)
 Tugela Fairy (Made of Stars) (2020)

Single discography

As lead artist

As featured artist

Awards and nominations

References 

Living people
South African artists
South African songwriters
University of KwaZulu-Natal alumni
Neo soul singers
1994 births